Wurtsboro–Sullivan County Airport  is a privately owned, public use airport located two nautical miles (4 km) northeast of the central business district of Wurtsboro, in Sullivan County, New York, United States. It is privately owned by a local pilot.  It is commonly called Wurtsboro Airport.

It is believed to be the oldest operating glider airport in the nation. The airport is located along Route 209 and the D & H Canal in the town of Mamakating.

History 
The grave of Manual Gonsalus, the first non-Indian settler, is located on the Airport. His tombstone is dated April 18, 1752, and is one of the oldest tombstones in the state.

Before it was an airport, it was the Helm Family farm. The first known operator of the Wurtsboro Airport was Lee Lord, he gave flying lessons in the 1920–30s. In the 1940s Wurtsboro Airport was bought by Anthony Barone Sr, and his wife Theresa from Hoboken, NJ. Anthony raised his family on the airport, in the old homestead that used to reside there. The Barones kept it a family business for many years, with both George and his sister Patricia running the business. Patricia and George ran a very well known airport offering glider and airplane rides, lessons and rental with many private clientele from New York City. Including the late Christopher Reeve, who used to fly gliders out of the airport.

The airport is located on Barone Road in the town of Mamakating, just north of the village of Wurtsboro.
After the sudden illness and subsequent deaths of both George and Patricia Barone, the airport was sold by the remaining family. 
In 2006 the airport was acquired by Shalom Lamm.  In February of 2021 it was purchased by one of the pilots who grew to love the airport over the many years he flew there. The airport still offers scenic airplane and glider rides today, as well as flying lessons, aircraft rental and aircraft maintenance.

Facilities and aircraft 
 Runway 5/23: 3592 x 60 ft (1095 x 18 m), Surface: Asphalt
 Runway 14/32: 2101 x 120 ft (640 x 37 m), Surface: Turf
 Runway 18/36: 1250 x 150 ft (381 x 46 m), Surface: Turf
 Runway 9/27: 1100 x 110 ft (335 x 34 m), Surface: Turf

Services available:
 Glider and Power Rides, Instruction, Rental, Sales and Tow.
 Hangars and Tiedowns.
 Attended 0900 – 1700.

There are 97 aircraft based at this airport: 52 single-engine and 45 gliders.

References

External links 
 Historic Wurtsboro Airport flies high after transformation
 Wurtsboro Airport takes off again under new leaders
 Wurtsboro Airport
 

Airports in New York (state)
Transportation buildings and structures in Sullivan County, New York